Christoph August Gersting (also known as Christian Gersting and August Christian Gersting; September 30, 1802 in Hanover – March 31, 1872 in Hanover) was a German mason, senator, and architect. He is best remembered for his classicist style of architecture. He was an instructor of Conrad Wilhelm Hase.

References 

1802 births
1872 deaths
German architects